The 2019–20 Albany Great Danes men's basketball team represented University at Albany, SUNY in the 2019–20 NCAA Division I men's basketball season. They played their home games at the SEFCU Arena in Albany, New York and are led by 19th-year head coach Will Brown. They finished the season 14–18, 7–9 in America East play to finish in seventh place. They lost in the quarterfinals of the America East tournament to Stony Brook.

Previous season
The Great Danes finished the 2018–19 season 12–20, 7–9 in America East Conference play to finish in sixth place. In the America East tournament, they were defeated by UMBC in the quarterfinals.

Roster

Schedule and results

|-
!colspan=12 style=| Non-conference regular season

|-
!colspan=9 style=| America East Conference regular season

|-
!colspan=12 style=| America East tournament
|-

|-

Source

References

Albany Great Danes men's basketball seasons
Albany Great Danes
2019 in sports in New York (state)